Joseph Gantner (Baden, Canton Aargau, Switzerland 11 September 1896—Basel 7 April 1988) was a Swiss art historian.

His father Alfred Gantner, a manager at Brown Boveri, and his wife Marie (née Wächter), a midwife. In 1932 Joseph Gantner married Maria Hanna Dreyfus.

Gantner's studies took him to the universities at Zurich, Basel, Geneva, and finally to Munich, where he completed a doctorate in 1920 under Heinrich Wölfflin (1864–1945). He also spent a semester in Rome with Adolfo Venturi. His Habilitationsschrift was completed in 1926. From 1922 or 1923 to 1927 he was Editor of the periodical Das Werk and later also of Das neue Frankfurt. From 1927 until 1932 Gantner taught at the Kunstschule in Frankfurt-am-Main.

He returned to Switzerland in 1933 when the Nazi menace began to increase. From 1926–28 and then again from 1933–38, he worked on a second Ph. D. from the University of Zurich. In 1938 at the age of 42 he was appointed Professor of Art History at the University of Basel, and remained there until retirement in 1967. In 1954 he became Rector of the University and that same year became a member of the Basel Art Museum Commission. He founded the Basler Beiträge zur Kunstgeschichte in 1943, and edited the Zeitschrift für Ästhetik und allgemeine Kunstwissenschaft from 1952 together with Heinrich Lützeler.

His portrait was painted by Augusto Giacometti, a second cousin of Alberto Giacometti, and is now in the possession of his daughter Vera.

Notes

References
Death notice, Neue Zürcher Zeitung, 9.4.1988
Obituary, Neue Zürcher Zeitung, 15.4.88
Reiner Haussherr, obituary, in Jahrbuch. Mainz Akademie der Wissenschaften und der Literatur, 1991, pp. 108–112
Caviezel-Rüegg, Zita: "Gantner, Joseph, Historisches Lexikon der Schweiz (online edition)
"Gantner, Joseph", Dictionary of Art Historians (accessed 10 January 2010)
Susan R. Henderson, "Building Culture:  Ernst May and the New Frankfurt Initiative, 1926-1931" (Peter Lang, 2013).
A full bibliography of his works can be found in J. Gantner: "Das Bild des Herzens": über Vollendung und Un-Vollendung in der Kunst. Reden und Aufsätze Berlin: Gebr. Mann, 1979.

1896 births
1988 deaths
Swiss art historians